Working Overtime may refer to:

 Overtime, time worked beyond normal working hours, or the pay received for such work
 "Workin' Overtime" (Roseanne), a 1989 television episode

Music
 Workin' Overtime, a 1989 album by Diana Ross, or the title song
 Workin' Overtime, a 2001 album by Adam Harvey
 "Working Overtime", a song by New Order from Waiting for the Sirens' Call, 2005
 "Working Overtime", a song by the Saints from Everybody Knows the Monkey, 1998
 "Working Overtime", a song by the Sore Losers, 2014